Lisson Gallery is a contemporary art gallery with locations in London and New York, founded by Nicholas Logsdail in 1967. The gallery represents over 50 artists such as Art & Language, Ryan Gander, Carmen Herrera, Richard Long, John Latham, Sol LeWitt, Robert Mangold, Jonathan Monk, Julian Opie, Richard Wentworth, Anish Kapoor, Richard Deacon and Ai Weiwei.

History 
Lisson Gallery was founded in 1967 by former artist Nicholas Logsdail and Fiona Hildyard when they renovated three floors of a derelict space in Bell Street, Lisson Grove, London. The opening exhibition in April 1967 was a group show of five young artists including Derek Jarman and Keith Milow. It soon became one of a small number of pioneering galleries in the UK, Europe and the United States to champion artists associated with Minimalism and Conceptual art. Within the gallery's first five years, it showed Carl Andre, Sol LeWitt, Donald Judd, Robert Ryman, Dan Graham, Mira Schendel, Lygia Clark and Yoko Ono. In the early seventies, Logsdail worked closely with Nicholas Serota when he was director of Modern Art Oxford.

In the 1980s, Logsdail exhibited many of the artists who came to be known under the term New British Sculptors, who came to maturity in the early-1980s. Lisson artists accounted for 14 Turner Prize nominations between 1984 and 1999, five of whom — Richard Deacon, Anish Kapoor, Tony Cragg, Grenville Davey and Douglas Gordon — were winners. He is also said to have 'converted' Charles Saatchi to conceptual art.

Lisson Gallery's London  spaces were designed by Tony Fretton in 1986 and 1992. From 2011 until 2017, the gallery also operated a branch in Milan, Italy.

Lisson Gallery opened its first office in New York in 2012. Alex Logsdail, the founder's son who had joined the gallery officially in 2009, took charge of its US expansion in 2016. A location in New York City opened in May 2016. The gallery, designed by StudioMDA and Studio Christian Wassmann, is a purpose-built  space beneath the High Line. An exhibition by Carmen Herrera inaugurated the New York space (May – June 2016). By 2020, the gallery expanded into the  space adjacent to its outpost at 504 West 24th Street.

Lisson Gallery opened a fifth location in Shanghai in 2019. It is located on Huqiu Road, near some of Shanghai's major museums and institutions such as Fosun Foundation, Rockbund Art Museum, and Christie's. In 2020, it opened a  outpost in East Hampton.

Lisson Gallery operates an artists’ retreat in a renovated palm oil factory on Lamu Island.

Lisson Gallery also opened a new space on Cork Street, London in October 2020. In 2021, the gallery operated a temporary space in the Tianjin Free-Trade Zone.

Artists 
Among others, Lisson Gallery has been representing the following living artists: 
 Marina Abramović
 John Akomfrah
 Allora & Calzadilla
 Adam Broomberg and Oliver Chanarin (since 2014)
 Daniel Buren
 Ryan Gander
 Rodney Graham
 Van Hanos (since 2020)
 Hugh Hayden (since 2018)
 Carmen Herrera (since 2010)
 Shirazeh Houshiary
 Anish Kapoor
 Liu Xiaodong (since 2012)
 Otobong Nkanga (since 2023)
 Jack Pierson (since 2022)
 Laure Prouvost (since 2017)
 Pedro Reyes
 Sean Scully (since 2019)
 Lawrence Weiner
 Ai Weiwei

In addition to living artists, Lisson Gallery also handles the estates of the following: 
 Roy Colmer
 Susan Hiller
 John Latham
 Hélio Oiticica (since 2019)
 Joyce Pensato (since 2014)
 Leon Polk Smith (since 2017)
 Ted Stamm (since 2017)

In the past, Lisson Gallery has represented the following:
 Mat Collishaw (until 2000)

Notable exhibitions 
 Ai Weiwei, Han vases redecorated with industrial paint, 2011.
 Richard Long, decorative walk, 2014.
 Carmen Herrera, 2016.

References

External links 

1967 establishments in England
Art galleries established in 1967
Contemporary art galleries in London
Art museums and galleries in Milan
Art museums and galleries in Manhattan
Buildings and structures in the City of Westminster
Contemporary art galleries in Italy